Parma Associazione Calcio had arguably its most successful season ever, thanks to a third-place finish in Serie A with the same points as runner-up Lazio, plus a victory against Juventus in the UEFA Cup Final. It also reached the Coppa Italia Final, where they were defeated by Juventus.

Squad

Transfers

Winter

Competitions

Serie A

League table

Results by round

Matches

Coppa Italia

Second round

Eightfinals

Quarter-finals

Semi-final

Final

UEFA Cup

First round

Second round

Eightfinals

Quarter-finals

Semi-finals

Final

Statistics

Squad statistics

Goalscorers
  Gianfranco Zola 19
  Marco Branca 7
  Dino Baggio 6
  Faustino Asprilla 6
  Fernando Couto 4

References

Parma Calcio 1913 seasons
Parma
UEFA Europa League-winning seasons